Angela Golden Bryan is a Caribbean-American writer, actress and cultural contributor. Bryan is mainly known for writing historical fiction books based on the labor revolt of 1878 on the island of St. Croix, which was back then a part of the Danish West Indies, but is now a part of the U.S. Virgin Islands.

Life and career 
As an actress, Bryan appeared on television including Fox's America's Most Wanted, Burn Notice, Simply Delicioso and Designing Spaces. Bryan also starred in minor roles in films including Secrets of the Magic City, Promises and Wild Sunflowers.

In 2018, Bryan published her first book, Fireburn the Screenplay: A story of passion ignited, based on the history of St. Croix.” This book is based on the labor revolt that took place in 1878 and pays tribute to Mary Thomas and other leaders of the revolt. According to Bryan, the inspiration to write the story came after hearing stories about her great-great grandmother who was part of this revolt, which was also known as the Fireburn.

The following year, Bryan released her second book, James and the Fireburn, a children's book about anti-bullying and human rights. James and the Fireburn was inspired by the same events of Caribbean history as her first novel.

Her film Fireburn the Documentary, which was based on her first book, premiered in 2021. The documentary interviews educators, historians, and artists regarding the labor revolt of 1878. Bryan’s nonprofit received a grant from the Community Foundation of the Virgin Islands in 2022 to place all of her Fireburn products into each of the public schools in the Virgin Islands.

Personal life 
Bryan partners with the United Nations Association of the United States of America as an Ambassador for Gender Equality. She is married, has two adult children and currently resides in South Florida.

Filmography

References

External links 
 

American people of Caribbean descent
Year of birth missing (living people)
Living people
American television actresses
21st-century American actresses